Daniel Gordon (born 1980 in Boston, Mass.) is an American artist who lives and works in Brooklyn, New York.

Life and work
Gordon is best known for producing large color photographs that operate somewhere between collage and set-up photography. His work, as described by The New York Times,
"Involves creating figurative tableaus from cut paper and cut-out images that Mr. Gordon then photographs. In addition, he seems motivated by a deeply felt obsession with the human body and the discomforts of having one."

He has exhibited his work in solo exhibitions at Zach Feuer Gallery, Wallspace, and Leo Koenig, Inc., Projekte in New York City and Claudia Groeflin Gallery in Zürich, Switzerland. Gordon has been included in exhibitions at the Museum of Modern Art, the Saatchi Gallery in London, Gallery 400 at the University of Illinois, and he was included in MoMA PS1's Greater New York 2010. He is the author of Portrait Studio (onestar press, 2009) and Flying Pictures (powerHouse books, 2009). His work is in the collection of the Museum of Modern Art, New York. Gordon was a guest lecturer at Sarah Lawrence College in 2009.

Education
2004–2006 Yale School of Art, Master of Fine Arts, New Haven, CT
1999–2004 Bard College, Annandale-on-Hudson, NYC

Images
Nude Portrait. 2008
Red Headed Woman. 2008

External links
 Daniel Gordon – Website
 Daniel Gordon – Triple Canopy
 New York Close Up – Art21 made a short film about Daniel Gordon in 2013

References

American contemporary artists
1980 births
Living people
American photographers